Weiße Laber (in its upper course also: Unterbürger Laber) is a river of Bavaria, Germany. It flows into the Altmühl in Dietfurt.

See also
List of rivers of Bavaria

References

Rivers of Bavaria
Rivers of Germany